The Real Thing is the fourth studio album from Contemporary Christian pop group pureNRG, and features the songs "Radio", "The Real Thing"  & "Sweet Jesus". The album reached No. 20 on the Billboard 200 chart, and No. 1 on the Billboard Top Christian Albums chart. The Sing-a-long versions of songs on this album include one song each from one of their previous albums. It is the final pureNRG album on Fervent Records. It was released July 14, 2009.

Track listing

Track information and credits taken from the album's liner notes.

Singles
"Radio" (July 2009) iTunes Store

Chart performance
 Billboard 200 – No. 20
Billboard Top Christian Albums – No. 1

Awards

The album was nominated for a Dove Award for Children's Music Album of the Year at the 41st GMA Dove Awards.

References

2009 albums
Warner Records albums
Fervent Records albums
PureNRG albums